Nowa Wieś Człuchowska is a former PKP railway station in Nowa Wieś Człuchowska (Pomeranian Voivodeship), Poland.

References 
Nowa Wieś Człuchowska article at Polish Stations Database, URL accessed at 7 March 2006

Railway stations in Pomeranian Voivodeship
Disused railway stations in Pomeranian Voivodeship
Człuchów County